The 27th and last Echo Awards ceremony, presented by the Bundesverband Musikindustrie (BVMI), honored the best-selling music in Germany. They took place on 12 April 2018 at Messe Berlin beginning on 20:15 UTC+1. During the ceremony, Echo Awards were presented in 22 categories.

Winners and nominees

Source:

References

2018 music awards